The fashion of the Indigenous peoples of the Americas encompasses the design and creation of high-fashion clothing and fashion accessories by the Indigenous peoples of the Americas. Indigenous designers frequently incorporate motifs and customary materials into their wearable artworks, providing a basis for creating items for the haute couture and international fashion markets. Their designs may result from techniques such as beadwork, quillwork, leather, and textile arts, such as weaving, twining, and tufting. In some cases, however, they choose not to include any materials associated with Indigenous cultures.

In the United States, in accordance with the Indian Arts and Crafts Act of 1990, in order to qualify as Native American designers, artists must be enrolled in a state or federally recognized tribe or be certified by a specified tribal council. In Canada, there are no specific laws to protect First Nations iconography and traditional arts, though two trademarks, "igloo tag"  and "Genuine Cowichan Approved" have been registered to protect Inuit and clothing designs for the Cowichan Tribes. In Latin America legislation is sparse, but some countries or individual states within countries with high Indigenous populations have passed laws to protect Indigenous heritage and design.

When Native American designers first broke into the modern fashion industry in the 1950s, they adopted a pan-Indian approach. By selecting motifs and iconography easily identified as part of Indigenous culture, they were able to gain acceptance and develop a market share with mainstream buyers. As the field of Native designers in high fashion expanded, individual designers moved away from pan-Indianism, expressing their individual identity, whether or not it was based on their traditional tribal heritage. Many have taken traditional themes and incorporated them into their works, while others have taken specific garments and updated them to contemporary aesthetics by changing necklines, sleeve lengths, hemlines, and other features.

Controversy has emerged over the misappropriation or inappropriate use of cultural heritage by non-Native designers. Respectful use of imagery by mainstream designers who are not Indigenous can help expand appreciation of Native cultures, but plagiarism of design or malapropos use reinforces negative stereotypes and spurs controversy. Similarly, utilizing artisan craftwork can expand awareness if designers are fairly compensated for their work and given credit for their contributions. Contemporary controversies have spurred both crowd-sourced and legislative action to protect the designs and cultural heritage of Indigenous designers.

History
Historical clothing of Native American peoples has been collected and displayed by curators of major museums with a focus on pre-20th century attire. For the most part, these collections failed to take into consideration the shift in clothing trends among Indigenous peoples brought about by assimilation policies or by access to tailoring training and industrially produced textiles. However, Indigenous-focused museums have featured exhibitions of contemporary Native fashion. For example, the National Museum of the American Indian in New York City's 2017 "Native Fashion Now" exhibit featured Project Runway finalist Patricia Michaels and The Museum of Indian Arts and Culture in Santa Fe held exhibits as early as 2007 on Native couture and Institute of American Indian Arts founder Lloyd Kiva New.

While Native peoples have always produced clothing, until the 20th century the garments they made were often for personal or ceremonial use. However, forced assimilation policies throughout the 19th and early 20th centuries focused on eradicating Native American culture, including religious observance, language, and other traditional practices. Later, policies such as the 1934 Indian Reorganization Act changed the strategy for the education of Native peoples, encouraging them instead to reconnect with their cultures, including the creation of traditional dress.

In 1942, the American anthropologist Frederic H. Douglas, sought to highlight the beauty of Native American fashion by presenting a fashion show featuring garments made by Native Americans between 1830 and 1950. During the same decade, Lloyd Kiva New, a Cherokee who had graduated from the Art Institute of Chicago began touring throughout Europe and the United States with clothing and accessory lines he had designed, using hand-woven and dyed fabrics and leather crafts. In 1945, New opened a studio in Scottsdale, Arizona, with financial backing from Douglas, which initially focused on belts, hats and purses. Influenced by Navajo medicine bags, his purses, decorated with hand-worked metals became a specialty. Recognizing the need to reduce labor costs, he began combining machine work with handcrafting and instituted an apprenticeship program to meet increasing production demands while gearing his designs for the up-scale market.

Gaining coverage from national magazines like Harper's Bazaar and The New Yorker, New began selling his bags at the Elizabeth Arden Salon and Neiman Marcus. Expanding into clothing with a focus on classic cuts and simple designs using quality materials, New incorporated woven Cherokee fabrics, bead- and silver-work into a line of coats and dresses for women and men's suits, capitalizing on the luxury clothing market which emerged after World War II. "Southwestern chic" became a national trend in the early 1950s. In 1951, New was the only Native American designer who participated in the Atlantic City International Fashion Show, winning national recognition. He began to consult with artists and incorporated silk screened fabrics using native motifs, such as Pima basket weaving designs, Hopi pottery patterns, Navajo and Zuni yei elements, drawing from a variety of tribal aesthetics. As with designers who followed him, his sacred symbols and iconography were modified to become secularized.

To encourage other Indigenous artists to enter fashion design and safeguard cultural traditions which he feared might be lost, New turned his attention to education in 1959, sponsoring a summer design project, known as the Southwest Indian Arts Project. The experimental project eventually resulted in the founding by New and other artists of the Institute of American Indian Arts (IAIA) in 1962. The purpose of the school was to provide an education that fostered pride in students' Indigenous heritage and featured the development of skills designed to improve their economic opportunities. New taught a printed textiles course focused on dying techniques, and Azalea Thorpe (Scottish) taught weaving. Josephine Myers-Wapp (Comanche) was hired to instruct students in the traditional techniques used to make garments and accessories, laying the groundwork for the aesthetic appreciation of tribal traditions. She taught students to use traditional materials like feathers, leather and shells, and methods including beadwork, ribbonwork and weaving to create garments. By 1965, IAIA was hosting local fashion shows and within three years, the students had begun showing their works in other venues in Arizona, New Mexico, Texas, and New York. Within ten years, the reputation of the textile design programs at the school had gained international acclaim.

In Mexico, before 1950 many Indigenous communities were isolated and produced their own traditional clothing. As roads improved and people began moving from the countryside to cities, many put aside their traditional clothing, to blend in with their new cosmopolitan neighbors. In 1965, Gilberto Ortiz (Mixtec) moved from San Andrés Lagunas, Oaxaca, to Mexico City and began training as a tailor under German businessman, José Schroeder. Acquiring traditional European styling, his first major client was movie icon, María Félix. In 1978, Ortiz left Schroeder and partnered with the Italian businessman, Edmundo Calanchini. He designed mainly for businessmen and politicians until 1997, when he opened his own shop aimed specifically at the haute couture market. In 2006, at the suggestion of his client Juan Gabriel, Ortiz launched his own label, Gioros, an acronym using the first two letters of each of his names, Gilberto Ortiz Osorio. In 2012, he was named one of the top three tailors in the world by the textile firm Scabal. Typically Ortiz produces classically styled garments using high-end fabrics, but his latest offering in 2017 featured men's and women's jeans.

During the 1970s, Native American designers began to make a name for themselves during the Indian and Natural movements, such as Jewel Gilham (Blackfeet) and Remonia Jacobsen (Otoe-Iowa). Gilham catered to working women, designing pantsuits and long dresses made of polyester fabrics with felt insets depicting geometric figures and native motifs. Jacobsen's work featured loose-fitting dresses featuring decorative techniques, such as embroidered ribbonwork in the Otoe and Iowa style, appliqué drawing on Seminole traditions, buckskin leggings patterned on Kiowa designs, as well as influences from Pueblo and Sioux decorative silhouettes. Fueled by the American Indian and Civil Rights Movement, countercultural consumers found appeal in Gilham and Jacobsen's work. Furthermore, their fashion fostered a pan-Indian unity in the quest for political power through self-expression.

1975 to 1990
When Josephine Wapp retired in 1975, Sandy Fife Wilson (Muscogee) took over instruction of her traditional techniques course and offered "Traditional and Contemporary Fashion Design" to include current fashion trends. Fife's students formed the Full Moon Fashions group and began targeting non-native women as prospective buyers for their products. In 1982, when Wendy Ponca (Osage) took over the fashion design courses at the IAIA, she renamed them fiber arts in accordance with other accredited university curricula, offering three levels of instruction. She founded the Waves of the Earth Fashion Group and required her students to participate in the fashion shows of the IAIA, giving them an opportunity to show their creations and discover how to market their works. Ponca changed the direction of Native American fashion by allowing the designers to determine whether their works would include traditional influences and media. She taught them garment design, structural integrity, and color theory, but allowed students to interpret how they used the lessons. Ponca's approach was to ignore demands to make designs fit stereotypical definitions of Indigenous identity. Instead she encouraged creativity and innovation, like utilizing mylar, a space-age material to create designs which reflected the Osage connection with the sky.

The fashion show of the Santa Fe Indian Market, hosted for nearly two decades by fashion expert, Jeri Ah-be-hill (Kiowa), quickly became another venue to showcase the students' work, using the body as a venue to display designs, rather than galleries. Native Uprising, initially called Native Influx was founded in the 1980s as a collaborative association of Indigenous artists, designers, and models, who were alumni of IAIA, with the express purpose of building a contemporary, Native fashion design movement and allowing members to profit from their fashion shows. With New as an advisor and Ponca as the coordinator, the group included many members who made a name for themselves in fashion, for example Marcus Amerman (Choctaw), who acted as the stage director and RoseMary Diaz (Santa Clara Pueblo), who majored in fashion design and creative writing, before turning to writing about fashion.

In 1981, Margaret Wood (Navajo/Seminole) of Arizona, known for fashion design as well as for her quilts, published Native American Fashion: Modern Adaptations of Traditional Designs. The book was the first treatment of contemporary Native American fashion and remains the sole in-depth treatment of the subject. Also in the 1980s, Indigenous designers like Luanne Belcourt (Chippewa-Cree) and Myrtle Raining Bird (Chippewa-Cree) operated their company Sitting Eagles, marketing custom-made garments on their reservation to high-end buyers. Jeanette Ferrara (Isleta Pueblo) opened a design studio known for coats and vests incorporating cotton, wool, and velvet, and Ardina Moore (Quapaw/Osage) founded Buffalo Sun in Oklahoma in 1983. Geraldine Sherman (Lakota) designed for non-native marketer and anthropologist Helene Hagan to produce garments featuring Native American iconography. Hagan marketed them, stressing their spiritual and symbolic meaning.

Healthcare professional and fashion designer, Marjorie Bear Don't Walk (Chippewa-Salish) designed high-end couture for working women and displayed her fashions featuring appliqué techniques at conferences. Shed ran a mail order business, allowing customers to provide her with their preferred materials which she then worked into her designs. In 1984, Selina Curley (Apache-Navajo) founded a design firm, Traditions by Selina, aimed at preserving the traditions of her heritage. Her typical designs are based on the Apache camp dress with a full, ankle-length skirt and long sleeves.

The Wheelwright Museum of the American Indian, located in Santa Fe, New Mexico, hosted Talking Threads: Contemporary Native American Fashions in 1986. The exhibit featured designs by Joyce Begay-Foss (Navajo), Loretta Tah-Martin (Apache-Ponca) and Michelle Tsosie Naranjo (Santa Clara-Navajo-Laguna Pueblo-Mission), among others. The following year, the Red Earth Festival was established in Oklahoma City, showcasing creations by non-native designer Michael Kors, along with Phyllis Fife (Muscogee), to demonstrate that Native clothing was part of mainstream fashion. Fife was part of a group of native designers known as the Fashion Drums of Red Earth, who have made the fashion show of the Red Earth Festival an annual event, demonstrating that native clothing is wearable for every day and not simply as ceremonial costuming. Also in 1987, Patta Joest (Choctaw) established her firm Patta LT with the label Dancing Rabbit, to create high-fashion, producing contemporary garments with design elements from Southeastern Woodland tribal heritage. They included Cherokee tear dresses and Seminole patchwork vests, incorporating features such as Plains Tribes-style beadwork. Her line also included innovative bras and lingerie as well as broomstick skirts.

The Indian Arts and Crafts Act of 1990 was passed by the United States Congress. It specified that for artists to market their works as Native American, they must be enrolled in a state or federally recognized tribe or be certified by a tribal council as a member and must disclose their affiliated tribe. The law aimed to curtail the misappropriation of Native American designs by non-Natives wishing to capitalize on the Indigenous market. For Indigenous Americans, their symbols, such as the headdress have ceremonial and sacred properties. Inappropriate use of such objects, like the 2014 Next Top Model use of the headdress for non-Native models and its use in Dallas by Chanel for their Métiers d'Art show, were all too frequent occurrences. Though the law made it illegal to sell items by those not affiliated as a tribal member, little could be done when designs, symbols, or names were usurped. The law, written to protect the tribes and their cultures as a whole, does not cover individuals, with the result that there is no protection for the works of fashion designers. As part of their tribal tradition, symbols of various tribes are not typically trademarked, but one exception is the name "Navajo", which was legally trademarked in 1943.

Soon after the change to US law, public debate in Canada over protection of intellectual property rights became a media topic. There are no Canadian laws that specifically protect against cultural appropriation. The government utilizes international agreements to uphold their fiduciary responsibility to First Nations. As in the US, laws cover communities as a whole and not individual copyright and it is difficult for Indigenous peoples to prevent misappropriation of their names and symbols. Most protections that exist are to protect economic rather than heritage rights. In two cases, trademarks have been obtained to protect Native artists. Since 1959, the "igloo tag" may be used only by Inuit to protect their works. The Cowichan Band Council has registered "Genuine Cowichan Approved" as a mark specifically for clothing designs.

1991–2010
The 1990s saw a split in the Native American fashion design styles, with one group pursuing simple silhouettes with defined, smooth transitions between fabric lines, while the other group focused on avant-garde Indigenous couture. Among those who favored classic, clean lines were Betty David (Spokane), known for her shearling coats; Dorothy Grant (Haida), who trained at Vancouver's Helen Lefeaux School of Fashion Design and whose work includes images of flora and fauna of the Pacific Northwest, formline art and basketry designs; and Penny Singer (Navajo), who added photographic images on fabric to her traditional men's and women's shirts and accessories decorated with beads and ribbon work. Virgil Ortiz (Cochiti Pueblo) and Grant were the first Native American fashion designers to exhibit at an event in Manhattan. They held a show together at the Mercedes-Benz New York Fashion Week in 2009, though Ortiz's work generally is known as more cutting-edge and noted for incorporating colors, shapes, and symbols from pottery in his fashion design. Angela DeMontigny (Chippewa-Cree/Métis) of southwestern Ontario, a Canadian First Nation designer, also followed the classic traditional lines, with edgy elements based initially on leather and suede garments before branching into jewelry and accessories.

In 1991, D’Arcy J. Moses (Pehdzeh Ki), whose bold colors and designs featuring beaver and other furs were carried in high-end retail stores like Holt Renfrew, Neiman Marcus and Saks Fifth Avenue, signed a contract with the Fur Council of Canada to help them improve their image, drawing anger from anti-fur activists. While the contract provided a steady income, the controversy created a distraction from his work. Other Indigenous designers from the era included the master weaver Margaret Roach Wheeler (Choctaw-Chickasaw), who earned a master's degree in art at Pittsburg State University in Kansas, under the tutelage of Marjorie Schick; Sean McCormick (Métis), who began designing footwear in the early 1990s and in 2008, launched Manitobah Mukluks; and Virginia Yazzie Ballenger (Navajo), New Mexican designer, most noted for her "fluted broomstick skirt and matching velveteen blouse". Aresta LaRusso founded Deerwater Design in Flagstaff in 1994 featuring items made of traditional silk or wool fabrics and deer or elk skin. To update her contemporary patterning, she used zebra and impala hide, decorated with beadwork, fringe, and silver.

Wendy Ponca, one of the leaders of the avant-garde group, left IAIA in 1993. After she was replaced by Pearl Sunrise (Navajo), a noted weaver, the fashion curriculum at IAIA was eliminated in 1995, though momentum for high fashion works produced by native designers was rising. Among Ponca's students at IAIA in the 1990s were the designers Pilar Agoyo (Ohkay Owingeh Pueblo/Cochiti Pueblo/Kewa Pueblo), who works on costuming for several films, including Indiana Jones and the Kingdom of the Crystal Skull (2008) and The Avengers (2012), and Patricia Michaels (Taos Pueblo), who went on to take second place in season 11 of Project Runway. Her women's jacket titled "Weathered Text: No Trespassing by the Taos War Chief." won the Best of Class award in the textiles category at the Santa Fe Indian Market in 2010.  Another of Ponca's students, Brenda Wahnee (Comanche), developed her own line Com-N-Acha, featuring fashion forward designs. Her works were featured in 2003 at the Grammy Fest party. Tazbah Gaussoin 
(Picuris Pueblo/Navajo), Consuelo Pascual (Navajo/Maya), and Rose Bean Simpson (Santa Clara Pueblo) were other Ponca students who began making a name in fashion circles in the 1990s.

Since 1995, the Canadian Aboriginal Festival (CANAB) has hosted a fashion show of First Nations designers. Dave Jones (Garden River Ojibwe), began producing an annual fashion show for the Canadian Aboriginal Music Awards (CAMA) in 2001. By 2008, the CANAB Festival featured six fashion shows, as well as booths for designers to exhibit their wares. In 1998, the Denver Art Museum hosted a fashion show, Indian Chic featuring the works of Dorothy Grant, Wendy Ponca, and Margaret Roach Wheeler. It was the first time a major museum had shown works in their collection of Indigenous garments, labeling them as "fashion". Other Native designers of the 2000s include Orlando Dugi (Navajo), Dallin Maybee (Northern Arapaho/Seneca), Connie Gaussoin (Navajo/Picuris Pueblo), the street style of Douglas Miles of Apache Skateboards (San Carlos Apache/Akimel O'odham) and the custom shoes of Louie Gong (Nooksack/Squamish). Dugi is self-taught in fashion, learning to sew, measure and create patterns from online resources. Jamie Okuma (Luiseño/Shoshone-Bannock), another self-taught artist, became the youngest person to earn the Best of Show ribbon at the Santa Fe Indian Market in 2000.

From the turn of the 21st century, there has been a resurgence in Latin America for Indigenous designs. The trend has been to partner with Indigenous communities of artisans to create fabrics for non-Native designers. In many countries, the Indigenous heritage is seen as part of the national identity and there was little recognition that the design elements non-Native designers used and modified were part of the intellectual property of Indigenous communities. Designers often used remnants of textiles or cut-out embroidery on one garment to use on another. Imitations of Indigenous designs were ordered from labor markets in Asia. After 2010, the trend began to change with slow recognition that original Indigenous designs and designers should be respected. One innovator in this period was Franklin Janeta (Puruhá), of Riobamba, Ecuador, who began working as an embroidery artisan as a child, and in 2000 opened Vispu, a store to market his designs. Modifying traditional clothing styles, he altered components like necklines and sleeve length to create more contemporary fashions. Around the same time, Eliana Paco Paredes (Aymara) of Bolivia began to design fashions based on the traditional costumes of the cholitas, using wool or aguayo fabrics, but fusing them with lace or silk and decorating them with rhinestones and sequins. In 2016, after showing her work at Bolivian Fashion Week, she was invited to participate in New York Fashion Week.

In 2005, the IAIA with support from the W. K. Kellogg Foundation, sponsored Tribal Fusions, as a cross-cultural fashion endeavor, uniting designers from Africa with Marcus Amerman, Dorothy Grant, Patricia Michaels, and Virginia Yazzie Ballenger for the annual fashion show at the Santa Fe Indian Market. It was a unique opportunity for designers from diverse Indigenous populations to share designs and methods of economic empowerment. In 2009, Jessica Metcalfe (Chippewa), a scholar who earned her doctorate from the University of Arizona, created a fashion blog called "Beyond Buckskin". Metcalfe used the blog to promote Native American designers, to talk about how they fit into popular culture and also to hold companies accountable when they attempted to appropriate Native culture. The following year, Patricia Michaels formed UNRESERVED Alliance, in an attempt to ensure that Native American fashion designers were represented at New York Fashion Week. Similarly to Native Uprising founded two decades previously, the collective of designers aimed through collaboration to improve inclusion of Indigenous artists.

2011 and beyond

As Native American designers recognized that marketing to Indigenous peoples alone limited their business sustainability, they increasingly created clothing that is derived from their cultural heritage but has been adapted to appeal to a larger aesthetic. Early designers tended to approach fashion from a pan-Indian perspective, but contemporary Indigenous designers often "stay within the realm of their own traditional tribal or regional clothing techniques". In 2012, Kelly Holmes (Cheyenne River Lakota), a former model, founded Native Max, "the first Native American fashion magazine". Jessica Metcalf (Turtle Mountain Chippewa), who wrote the "Beyond Buckskin" blog opened a fashion boutique in Gardena, North Dakota, that same year. Metcalfe, along with photographer Anthony Thosh Collins and designer Bethany Yellowtail (Northern Cheyenne/Crow) created a compilation of fashion called Beyond Buckskin Lookbook which she says is the "first compilation of modern Native fashion produced exclusively by Natives".

In Ecuador, Lucía Guillín (Puruhá) launched Churandy featuring the dress styles of Indigenous Andes communities with contemporary modifications in 2012. Her clothing lines have expanded to include blouses, jackets, and shorts featuring embroidery patterns and colors typical to the region. The same year, Sisa Morocho (Puruhá) also launched her design company Sumak Churay in Quito, after studying fashion at the Ana MacAulife Institute. Her father's death had prompted her to leave the family hat business and branch out on her own. Using motifs from the Puruhá culture and adorning them with beads, embroidery, and sequins on brightly colored fabrics, she first sold blouses and then became known for dresses. In 2015, Morocho was able to open a second store featuring her designs in Riobamba. 

In 2013, Victoria Kakuktinniq (Inuit) founded Victoria's Arctic Fashion to market her designs. She creates fur and leather winterwear goods including headbands, jackets, gloves, and parkas, using sealskin and decorated with fox cuffs and embroidery. In 2015 Kakuktinniq won the Business of the Year award from the Nunavut annual trade show.

The Italian designing firm, Ermenegildo Zegna, opened a fashion institute in 2016, in the Azcapotzalco neighborhood of Mexico City with the goal of teaching the techniques of design to Indigenous women. Students enrolled were members of the Mazahua, Nahua, Otomí, Purépecha, Triqui and Tzeltal ethnic groups. The training the women received focused on tailoring techniques rather than on native design elements in an effort to allow the women to move from craftwork into the high fashion market. That same year, Nala Peter (Inuit) began making sealskin bras and panties at the suggestion of her partner, link marketing them online and was invited to participate in the Floe Edge: Contemporary Art and Collaborations exhibition in Nunavut. Another exhibitor at the show was Nicole Camphaug (Inuit), who designs footwear with sealskin and fur heels and vamps.
 
In 2016, a major traveling exhibit, "Native Fashion Now," which traveled to venues from the Peabody Essex Museum in Salem, Massachusetts, to Philbrook Museum of Art in Tulsa, Oklahoma, to the Portland Art Museum in Oregon to the Smithsonian's National Museum of the American Indian in Manhattan, put the spotlight on contemporary Native American fashion. Featuring designs from 75 fashion designers from throughout Canada and the United States, the exhibit presented a range of styles and designs from diverse cultures, such as Alano Edzerza (Tahltan Nation), Maya Stewart (Chickasaw-Muscogee-Choctaw) and Bethany Yellowtail (Northern Cheyenne-Crow), among others. Becki Bitternose (George Gordon), who designs jackets and coats from Pendleton blankets, was featured at the 2016 New York Fashion Week. 

Vancouver hosted its first Indigenous Fashion Week in 2017 with designs from numerous First Nations designers, including Sho Sho Esquiro (Kaska Dena/Cree), known for elaborately decorated gowns, enhanced with fur, beaver tail, salmon skin, feathers and shells combined with gold trim; Evan Ducharme (Métis), whose work focuses on sustainable and Eco-friendly design and incorporates Métis elements like knotted belts based on fishing net techniques; Jeneen Frei Njootli (Vuntut Gwitchin), who presented a collection using innovative design incorporating fur and hides; Autum Jules (Tlingit), noted for her use of textures and color to reflect the connection between people and the earth; Tyler-Alan Jacobs, (Squamish) whose designs reflect his identity as a two-spirit artist; and Alano Edzerza (Tahltan), known as a multi-media artist whose work incorporates silk-screened images of Native iconography on his garments. Jill Setah (Yunesit'in) participated in the Vancouver event, after having showcased her works at both Oxford Fashion Week and Paris Fashion Week. Tishynah Buffalo (George Gordon), who lives in Alberta, Canada, was invited to participate in London Fashion Week in 2017, to showcase her innovative designs which often use Pendleton blankets and are decorated with beadwork and Cree floral patterns. Helen Oro, (Pelican Lake), who designs fashion accessories, also participated in the event. Oro who has found ceremonial beading constricting, adds beadwork to glasses, head bands, heels and creates jewelry pieces.

Notable Native American fashion designers 
Tammy Beauvais - designed the cape given to Michelle Obama by Sophie Grégoire-Trudeau.

Tishynah Buffalo - incorporates Cree designs

Eliana Paco Paredes - Aymara fashion designer

Controversy 

Non-Native companies and individuals have attempted to use Native American motifs and names in their clothing designs. As early as the 1940s, Anglo designers in the United States had developed a type of one and two-piece dresses called "squaw dresses." These outfits were based on Mexican and Navajo skirts and Western Apache camp dresses. The dresses, also known as Fiesta, Kachina, Tohono or Patio Dresses "represented both idealized femininity and Americanness because of their Native American origins." These dresses, knowingly appropriating Indigenous styles, were considered a "fashion sensation" of the time, according to the Arizona Daily Star. The Navajo style that influenced the creation of Squaw Dresses was itself an adaptation of European styles by Navajo women. The bodice of a Squaw Dress drew from Western Apache and Tohono O'odham styles. Squaw dresses were popular in the United States for around 20 years. The original "designer" of the Squaw Dress was Dolores Gonzales of Tucson, Arizona. Gonzales herself said of her dresses, "I didn't design them; I lifted them. The Indian women were already wearing them." Other people involved in promoting and working on the designs included the designers Cele Peterson and George Fine.

Urban Outfitters created a collection in 2011 called "Navajo," featuring underwear, hats and other items with art based on traditional Navajo rugs. The Navajo Nation responded by issuing a cease and desist on their use of the word "Navajo". Pop band No Doubt released a 2012 video featuring stereotypical images of the American frontier and ended up pulling the video and issuing an apology. Victoria's Secret clothed a model in a "Native-inspired" bikini and giant war headdress at their fashion show that same year. Victoria's Secret was again accused of cultural appropriation in their 2017 fashion show, which featured outfits inspired by traditional Native fashion.

In 2017, Parisian designer Christian Louboutin drew criticism for paying Yucatec Maya artisans only 238 pesos (around $13 US) each for bags he sold for around $28,000 pesos (equivalent to $1,550 US). The controversy was sparked when activists called out Louboutin for exploiting the artisans. He paid for all of their materials and paid the workers 478 pesos per day for 6 hours of work, which compares to the average Mexican salary in the region of 80 pesos for 8 hours of work per day. The artisans were thankful for the work and the monies they received, but Louboutin's firm pulled the page advertising the bags from his website. That same year, the Peruvian textile company Kuna withdrew a collection after complaints that the company had misappropriated kené designs from the Shipibo-Conibo people. The controversy motivated Congresswoman Tania Pariona Tarqui to introduce legislation to protect the cultural heritage and symbols of Indigenous communities in Peru.

Another issue in regard to Native American fashion is the stereotypical representation of Indigenous peoples' clothing in mass media depictions. Native Americans are portrayed most often in historical contexts wearing traditional clothing.

See also
Textile arts of indigenous peoples of the Americas
Inuit clothing

References

Citations

Bibliography

  and  

 

 
 

 ,   and  

 ,   and  

  and  

 

 

 

Fashion design
Design occupations
Arts occupations
Indigenous fashion designers of the Americas
Native American art
Indigenous textile art of the Americas
Mesoamerican art
American fashion
Native American clothing